Metro Toledo can refer to: 

 Toledo metropolitan area, a metropolitan area centered on the American city of Toledo, Ohio
 Toledo (Naples Metro), a station on Line 1 of the Naples Metro